INT-2 proto-oncogene protein also known as FGF-3 is a protein that in humans is encoded by the FGF3 gene.

Function 

FGF-3 is a member of the fibroblast growth factor family. FGF3 binds to Fibroblast Growth Factor Receptor 3 (FGFR3) to serve as a negative regulator of bone growth during ossification. Effectively, FGF-3 inhibits proliferation of chondrocytes within growth plate.

FGF family members possess broad mitogenic and cell survival activities and are involved in a variety of biological processes including embryonic development, cell growth, morphogenesis, tissue repair, tumor growth and invasion.

Clinical significance 

The FGF3 gene was identified by its similarity with mouse fgf3/int-2, a proto-oncogene activated in virally induced mammary tumors in the mouse. Frequent amplification of this gene has been found in human tumors, which may be important for neoplastic transformation and tumor progression. Studies of the similar genes in mouse and chicken suggested the role in inner ear formation. Also, haploinsufficiency in the FGF3 gene is thought to cause otodental syndrome.

Interactions 
FGF3 (gene) has been shown to interact with EBNA1BP2.

References

Further reading